The Zarhites were a branch of the tribe of Judah descended from Zerah, the son of Judah.

References

Tribes of Israel
Tribe of Judah